Ras-related protein Rab-39B is a protein that in humans is encoded by the RAB39B gene.

This gene encodes a member of the Rab family of proteins. Rab proteins are small GTPases that are involved in vesicular trafficking.

References

Further reading